The Highland Park Public Library is the public library serving Highland Park, Illinois. It is located at 494 Laurel Ave across the intersection from the Metra station.

The library has 611,655 circulation items and 23,187 registered cardholders with a total of  361,614 library visits in FY05, who constitute 77% of the city's residents. According to the 2003 Citizen Survey of the City of Highland Park, however, 26,433 (88%) of the residents made use of library services.

History
At the July 7, 1887 meeting of the City Council, a number of citizens presented a petition requesting that the council establish and maintain a public library and on September 14, 1887 the Highland Park City Council adopted an ordinance for the establishment of a tax-supported public library and appropriated $260 annually for its maintenance. Books began circulating from the library on April 7, 1888.

In 1903 a commission from the Highland Park Woman's Club contacted Mr. Andrew Carnegie for a financial donation to construct a new library. Mr. Carnegie was willing to donate $10,000 for the construction of a library building in Highland Park, provided that the city owned the site.  Mr. Arthur C. Thomson, of Brookline, Massachusetts offered to give the city a piece of property upon which to locate the new library. The lot that he gave to the library was located on Laurel Ave. one block south of Central Street, and just east of St. Johns Ave.

By 1927 it was evident to the Board that the Carnegie library was inadequate and that only an entirely new library would do. The population of Highland Park, just 4,209 in 1910, had grown to approximately 10,000.  The City Council proposed a levy increase spread over 7 years to raise the estimated $150,000 to build the new library. The Chicago architectural firm of Holmes and Flinn (Morris Grant Holmes and Raymond W. Flinn) designed the original modified Gothic style structure built of Wisconsin limestone with Indiana limestone trim. The new library was dedicated on Sept. 20, 1931.

In 1960, the Library Board decided to build an addition on the west side of the existing library. Bertram Weber was hired to design what is now known as the Children's Wing in the same modified Gothic style of the original building and in 1976 a modern adult wing (20,000 sq. ft.) designed by the firm Wendt, Cedarholm & Tippens was added to the south of the original building.

References

 Frooman, Mary E. (June 1972) The History of the Highland Park Public Library.

External links
Highland Park Public Library Home Page

Public libraries in Illinois
Highland Park, Illinois
Carnegie libraries in Illinois
Libraries in Lake County, Illinois